The French siege of Calais in early 1558 was part of the Italian War of 1551–1559 between France and England and their respective allies. It resulted in the seizure of the town by France.

The Pale of Calais had been ruled by England since 1347, during the Hundred Years' War. By the 1550s, England was ruled by Mary I of England and her husband Philip II of Spain. When the Kingdom of England supported a Spanish invasion of France, Henry II of France sent Francis, Duke of Guise, against English-held Calais, defended by Thomas Wentworth, 2nd Baron Wentworth. Following the failure in mid-1557, a renewed attack captured the outlying forts of Nieullay and Rysbank and Calais was besieged.

Background

The victory of Louis XI of France over Charles the Bold in 1477 and the annexation of Picardy to the French royal domain marked the end of a status quo over the possession of Calais. For nearly a century the House of Valois had preferred to turn their armies towards Italy, rich and technologically ahead of the rest of Europe, rather than take Calais. France had to fight the English on three occasions during the sixteenth century (1526, 1544, and 1547) when they attempted to extend the English possessions in Picardy. At the behest of Pope Paul IV, in 1557 France put an end to the Truce of Vaucelles which concluded the tenth Italian war, and resumed hostilities in the Kingdom of Naples. In response, the crown of Spain returned to its customary strategy since the Battle of Ceresole: it again attacked in Picardy and inflicted a crushing defeat on the Constable of Montmorency at the Battle of St. Quentin (1557). Henry II of France had lost his best captains and the road to Paris was open to invasion. In these circumstances, Francis, Duke of Guise, who had raised an army and prepared to lead it in Italy, was recalled to Picardy and promoted to lieutenant-general of France. To avoid the intervention of an English expeditionary force, King Henry II of France arranged, in great secrecy, to attack Calais in the winter with 30,000 men assembled at Compiegne, Montreuil-sur-Mer, and Boulogne-sur-Mer.

Capture of Calais

Calais, lacking any natural land defence, its continued English control depended on fortifications maintained and built up at some expense. Near Calais, the Franco-Burgundian forces were frequently pitted against the English garrison forces and against the Duchy of Burgundy. Relieved by the long confrontation between Burgundy and France, English rule over Calais was able to flourish for 150 years. The French and the Burgundians each coveted the city, but preferred to see it under the English rather than their rival.

On 1 January 1558, the French vanguard invested Sangatte, Fréthun and  Nielles, and the Army Corps reduced Fort Risban the next day. On 3 January, the artillery moved into Fort Nieulay at Rysbank. Thomas, Lord Wentworth, completely overwhelmed by a lightning attack, handed the keys of the city to the French on 7 January. The booty taken by the French was more than they had hoped for: food for three months and nearly 300 guns. The English defences of Guînes and Hames soon also fell. Henry II of France arrived at Calais on 23 January 1558. France had reconquered the last territory it had lost in the Hundred Years' War and put an end to two centuries of fighting between England and France. The new French administration made a particularly efficient demarcation of the border, created a new division of farmland, reorganized the 24 parishes, and reconstructed villages and churches. No harm came to the English residents: after a rather uncomfortable night, they were escorted to the waiting boats and given safe passage across the English Channel.

In England, there was shock and disbelief at the loss of this final Continental territory. The story goes that a few months later Queen Mary, on her death bed, told her ladies: "When I am dead and cut open, they will find Philip and Calais inscribed on my heart."

Consequences

Lord Wentworth, the governor of the city, and the English inhabitants of the Pale of Calais returned to England. Calais was declared a "reclaimed land" to commemorate the restoration of French rule. François de Guise was able to strike back against the Spaniards: during the summer he attacked Thionville and Arlon, and was about to invade Luxembourg when the treaties of Le Cateau were signed. In April 1559 the Treaty of Cateau-Cambrésis between France and Spain (allied to England) included recognition of Calais as an English possession in temporary French custody pending a purchase price of half a million gold crowns to be paid by France in eight years' time.

However, in 1562 upon the outbreak of the French Wars of Religion, England's new queen, Elizabeth I, revived her kingdom's claims to Calais and occupied the French port of Le Havre in order to keep it until France should restore Calais. French forces ejected the English in 1563 and the Treaty of Troyes (1564) effectively recognized French ownership of Calais in exchange for payment to England of 120,000 crowns. Although the treaty made no mention of Calais, the French paid the 120,000 crowns in return for all rights to Le Havre and freedom of commerce was agreed between the two countries. The French believed that the English failure to maintain the occupation of Le Havre in return for Calais, meant the English had forfeited all rights to Calais and Elizabeth was in no position to press the case any further.

References

1558 in France
Calais 1558
Calais 1558
Calais 1558
History of Calais
1558 in England
Conflicts in 1558
Italian War of 1551–1559